University of Surabaya (UBAYA) is a university in Rungkut, Surabaya, East Java, Indonesia. UBAYA is the successor to Trisakti University of Surabaya which was founded in 1966. Its name was changed to the University of Surabaya in 1968. Construction on the campus began on 11 March 1968. The university has three campuses: Ngagel, Tenggilis (both in Surabaya), and Trawas, Mojokerto Regency. Ngagel campus is for diploma program and rectorate building, Rungkut campus is the main campus for undergraduate and postgraduate studies, and Trawas campus is for outdoor learning activities. University of Surabaya was awarded Institutional 'A' Accreditation from the National Accreditation Board for Higher Education (BAN-PT) in 2015 and also noted as one of 50 Promising Indonesian Universities.

Programs

Faculty of Pharmacy 
Undergraduate
 Pharmacy (S.Farm.; Bachelor of Pharmacy)
Professional Education
 Pharmacists (Apt.; Pharmacist)
Postgraduate
 Master of Pharmaceutical Science (M.Farm.; Master of Pharmacy)

Faculty of Law 
Undergraduate
 Law (S.H.; Bachelor of Law)
Postgraduate
 Master of Law (M.H.)
 Master of Notary (M.Kn.)

Faculty of Business and Economics 
Undergraduate
 Economical Science (S.E.; Bachelor of Economics)
Banking and Investment
International Business
 Management (S.M.; Bachelor of Management)
Finance, Investment, and Financial Intermediation
Marketing Management
Service and Tourism Management
Business Network Management
Entrepreneurship and Human Resources Empowerment
 Accountancy (S.Ak.; Bachelor of Accountancy)
 International Business Network (Single/Dual Degree, S.M. and B.B.A. if dual)
 Professional Accounting (Single/Dual Degree, S.Ak. and B.Com. if dual)
Professional Education
 Accountants (Ak.; Accountant)
Postgraduate
 Master of Management (M.M.)
 Master of Accounting (M.Ak.)

Faculty of Psychology 
Undergraduate
 Psychology (S.Psi.; Bachelor of Psychology)
Postgraduate
 Master of Scientific Psychology (M.Si.; Master of Science)
 Master of Professional Psychology (M.Psi.; Master of Psychology)
Doctoral
 Psychology (Dr.; Doctor)

Faculty of Engineering 
Undergraduate
 Electrical Engineering (S.T.; Bachelor of Engineering)
 Chemical Engineering (S.T.)
 Industrial Engineering (S.T.)
 Informatics Engineering (S.Kom.; Bachelor of Computer)
 Manufacturing Engineering (S.T.)
 Business Information System (under Informatics Engineering Department) (S.Kom.)
 Multimedia (under Informatics Engineering Department) (S.Kom.)
 Information Technology Dual Degree (under Informatics Engineering Department) (S.Kom., B.I.T.)
Postgraduate
 Master of Industrial Engineering (M.T.; Master of Engineering)

Faculty of Biotechnology 
Undergraduate
 Biotechnology (S.Biotek.; Bachelor of Biotechnology)
 Bionutrition & Food Innovation (S.Biotek.)
Postgraduate
 Master of Biotechnology (M.Biotek.)

Faculty of Creative Industry 
Undergraduate
 Product Design and Management (S.Ds.; Bachelor of Design)
 Lifestyle and Fashion Design (S.Ds.)

Faculty of Medicine 
Undergraduate
 Medicine (S.Ked.; Bachelor of Medicine)
Professional Education
 Medical Doctor (dr.)

Polytechnic (Diploma, A.Md.; Intermediary Expert) 
 Accounting (morning session)
 Computer Accounting (evening session)
 Marketing Management (morning session)
 Professional Selling (evening session)
 Business Administration (morning and evening sessions)
 Secretary (morning session only)
 Business English (morning and evening sessions)
 Taxation (morning session)
 Professional Taxation (evening session)

Campuses 
 Ngagel Campus on Ngagel Jaya Selatan Street 169, Surabaya, East Java (rectorate and diploma programs)
 Tenggilis Campus on Raya Kalirungkut Street, Surabaya, East Java (34 acres) (undergraduate, graduate, and doctoral programs)
 Ubaya Training Center (UTC) in Trawas, Mojokerto, East Java (74 acres) (outdoor learning and activities)

List of rectors

International Village 
The International Village is aimed at bringing under one roof the international education and cultural centres operating in Indonesia. It will enable the general public to more easily access their services.

Units and institutions 
 Center for Research and Community Services (SBRC)
 Center for Environmental Studies (PSL)
 Center for Human Rights Studies (PUSHAM)
 Center for Business and Industrial Studies (CBIS)
 Information Center for Drugs and Pharmaceutical Services (PIOLK)
 Central City Community Empowerment (PUSDAKOTA)
 Centre for Professional Development (CPD)

UBAYA Men's and Women's Basketball Team 
 UBAYA men's basketball team
 UBAYA women's basketball team

References

External links 
 

Educational institutions in Surabaya
Educational institutions established in 1968
Private universities and colleges in Indonesia
Universities in East Java